Stary Suszec  is a village in the administrative district of Gmina Suszec, within Pszczyna County, Silesian Voivodeship, in southern Poland.

References

Stary Suszec